Kanieae is a tribe in the plant family Myrtaceae from Oceania and south-East Asia with a main diversity center in Australia.

Genera
Barongia (Australia)
Sphaerantia (Australia)
Ristantia (Australia)
Mitrantia (Australia)
Basisperma
Tristaniopsis
Lysicarpus (Australia)
Kania

References

Rosid tribes
Myrtaceae